Agathe de La Fontaine (born 27 March 1972) is a French actress. Her film roles include Train de vie (1998), which shared the 1999 Sundance World Cinema Audience Award with Run Lola Run, and Love in Paris, the sequel to 9½ Weeks. La Fontaine was married to former football player Emmanuel Petit from 2000 to 2002.

Selected filmography
 2007 – Le Scaphandre et le papillon, Inès
 2000 – Io amo Andrea, Francesca
 1998 – Train de vie, Esther
 1997 – Love in Paris, Claire
 1995 – La Nouvelle Tribu, Victoria
 1994 – Louis 19, le roi des ondes
 1994 – Killer Kid, Isabelle
 1994 – Jeanne
 1994 – La Caverne de la Rose d'or (Fantagaro), Princesse Angélique

References

External links

1972 births
Living people
French film actresses
Actresses from Paris
20th-century French actresses
21st-century French actresses